Tinissa ruwenzorica is a moth of the family Tineidae. It was described by László Anthony Gozmány in 1966. It is found in Uganda.

References

Endemic fauna of Uganda
Moths described in 1966
Scardiinae
Insects of Uganda
Moths of Africa